Samuel Bowden (fl. 1733-1761) was an English physician and poet

Bowden, from Frome, Somerset, was the author of two volumes of poems published from 1733-5. From the Gentleman's Magazine, to which he was an occasional contributor, it is deduced that he was living in 1761, while a passing mention of him in 1778 is in the past tense. The writer adds that he was a friend of Elizabeth Singer Rowe, poet, and belonged to the same communion. Bowden was therefore a nonconformist, and may be a relative of the Rev. John Bowden who preached Mrs. Rowe's funeral sermon.

References

Attribution

Year of birth missing
Year of death missing
18th-century English people
18th-century English medical doctors
People from Frome
18th-century English poets
English male poets
18th-century English male writers
18th-century English writers